Patton Island is an island in the Tennessee River in Lauderdale County, Alabama, in the United States.

Patton Island was named for Robert M. Patton, the 20th Governor of Alabama.

References

River islands of Alabama
Landforms of Lauderdale County, Alabama
Tennessee River